Soloman George Budinger (born 21 August 1999) is an English cricketer. He made his Twenty20 debut on 18 June 2021, for Nottinghamshire in the 2021 T20 Blast. He made his List A debut on 25 July 2021, for Nottinghamshire  in the 2021 Royal London One-Day Cup.

References

External links
 

1999 births
Living people
English cricketers
Nottinghamshire cricketers
Leicestershire cricketers
Birmingham Phoenix cricketers
Sportspeople from Colchester